Pakistan Airlines Football Club, commonly known as PIA F.C., is a Pakistani football club based in Karachi, Sindh, Pakistan. The club was to compete in 2018–19, but withdrew due to financial issues. The club is most successful club in Pakistan, in terms of league titles, winning nine titles with their first league title in 1971, and their last title win was in the season of 1998–99.

History
The club was founded in 1958, to represent Pakistan International Airlines in Inter-Departmental League. Their first championship came in 1971 when they defeated Karachi in the finals, the club successfully defended their title in 1972 when they held off Peshawar White. Their third title came in the first of the two 1975 seasons, defeating provincial side Punjab A. In 1976 they retained their title, holding off a challenge from Pakistan Railways FC.

Pakistan Airlines were defending champions in 1978, after there being no football 1977 due to martial law, but they continued to dominate Pakistani football and beat Sindh Red to take the championship for a fifth time. They defeated Pakistan Air Force in 1981 to win their sixth title. They had to wait eight years for their next title win, Sindh Government Press were the team beaten in 1989 (II).

In the season of 1992–93, they won their eighth title, when they defeated Pakistan Army. In the 1997(II) season, they fought off tough competition from Allied Bank to win their ninth national championship.

Pakistan Premier League era
The club was added into 2007–08 Pakistan Premier League, as the league expanded from 12 to 14 teams. In their first season, the club finished at sixth position. The club competed in 2008 National Football Challenge Cup but finished third in their group and failed to qualify.

In the season of 2008–09, the club dropped two places and finished eighth, although the club performed well in the 2009 National Football Challenge Cup, as they finished runners up to Khan Research Laboratories, losing the finals 1–0. In 2011–12 Pakistan Premier League, the club recorded their biggest when they lost 4–0 to Khan Research Laboratories at home.

The club finished their highest position in Pakistan Premier League when they finished fourth in the 2014–15 Pakistan Premier League and were runners-up in 2015 NBP National Challenge Cup, losing again to Khan Research Laboratories. In 2018–19 season, they were eliminated in 2018 National Challenge Cup group stages and withdrew from league due to financial issues, and were relegated.

Performance in AFC competitions
Asian Club Championship: two appearances
1986: Qualifying Stage
1991: Qualifying Stage
Asian Cup Winners Cup: two appearances
1992/93: Withdrew in First Round
1998/99: Withdrew in First Round

References

External links
 PIA site

Football clubs in Pakistan
Football in Karachi
Pakistan International Airlines
1958 establishments in Pakistan
Association football clubs established in 1958
Works association football clubs in Pakistan